The LMS Stanier Class 4P 3-Cylinder 2-6-4T is a class of steam locomotives designed for work over the London, Tilbury and Southend Railway route. All 37 were built in 1934 at Derby Works and were numbered 2500–2536. The third cylinder was provided to allow increased acceleration between the many stops on the L.T.&S.R. line. From 1935 the LMS switched to constructing a very similar, albeit simpler, 2-cylinder design.

Production
The 37 three-cylinder express passenger tank locomotives were designed specifically for the London Tilbury and Southend line of the London Midland & Scottish railway (LMS) where extra power was needed to operate the heavy outer suburban trains to tight schedules. The inside cylinder and valve gear created additional maintenance and was deemed unnecessary for other duties. The locomotives were built in 1934 at LMS Derby Works.

Withdrawal
The class were withdrawn from 1960 to 1962.

Preservation

The first member of the class to be built, No. 2500 has survived and is on static display at the National Railway Museum in York. It is the sole survivor of this class and is painted in LMS lined black livery.

References

External links 

 Class 4P-F Details at Rail UK

4 Stanier 2-6-4T (3-cyl)
2-6-4T locomotives
Preserved London, Midland and Scottish Railway steam locomotives
Railway locomotives introduced in 1934
Standard gauge steam locomotives of Great Britain
1′C2′ h3t locomotives
Passenger locomotives